Basauri is a major municipality of Biscay, in the Basque Country, an Autonomous Community in northern Spain.

The town is a part of the Greater Bilbao conurbation, being only a few kilometers south of Bilbao. It is an industrial town that also includes monuments such as the tower-house of Ariz. It holds the only prison in the province, located where the rivers Nervión and Ibaizabal meet. The municipality has 40,589 inhabitants (2019).

Geography
Basauri is located in the metropolitan region of the Greater Bilbao, on both sides of the river Nervión and the lower valley of the river Nervión and Ibaizabal. Basauri is located at joining point of the two most important rivers of Biscay, forming a small river plain (in the border with Etxebarri) a series of meanders have been built, now engaged in their most industrial facilities. Basauri also joins the roads coming from Orduña-Urduña and Durango following the course of the two rivers. A neighborhood took its name from the joining of both paths: Bidebieta (two paths).

From the river area where the municipality was born, the land rises gradually culminating in the mountain Malmasín (361 m) of clayey nature, in the border with Arrigorriaga.

Bordering towns

Bordered on the north by Bilbao, Etxebarri and Galdakao, on the south and west by Arrigorriaga and on the east Galdakao and Zaratamo.

Neighbourhoods

Climate
Basauri is in an oceanic climate zone, warm and humid. Rainfall is well distributed throughout the year, finding no particular rainy season. Temperatures are moderate throughout the year, with small thermal fluctuations.

Demographics 

Several elements influenced the strong growth experienced by Basauri in the 20th century. Being a communications hub, Basauri was a very important factor to consider. Its proximity to the mines of Ollargan Morro and Miravilla and the Basauri-Galdakao Group's mines caused an increase of population for the municipality. Also the conversion of the mills into baking industry contributed to this increase. But the element that most contributed to the population development was the installation in 1892 of the first major industry, "La Basconia".

The rapid growth that underwent the municipality, made its population multiplied by 24.6 in the period 1900–1975. But the largest increases in population started in the 1950s with the installation of new industries which created between 1950 and 1960 a population growth of the 97%, which continued in the next decade with an increase of the 80%.

In 1984 it started a slow but progressive population decline, although it had declined in 1979 with the industrial crisis, the year in which it was indicated the historical maximum population of 55,648 inhabitants. In the last estimate by the NSI, 16 September 2007, the population of Basauri rose to 43,250 inhabitants.

History 

Basauri became independent from Arrigorriaga in 1510 or at least, is the date taken as official, because there is no document to verify that at that date any meetings were held between mayors of both towns . Basauri did not get representation in the General Assembly of Guernica until 1858. Since then, it remained the largest population center and town hall in the neighborhood of San Miguel de Basauri until 1902, when it was approved the transfer of the town hall to Arizgoiti, as this area of growing population and equidistant from the two furthest points of the municipality: Finaga (San Miguel).

Basauri was until the end of the 19th century a predominantly rural people, until that time when the factory of Basconia came and with it the industrialization of the town, which went in 50 years from a few thousands of inhabitants to having 55,000 in 1978. Thousands of families from all regions of Spain nurtured Basauri with new people and buildings, radically changing its image and urbanism.

Toponymy 
The name Basauri  means 'population in the forest.' Basa(root Basoa), meaning 'forest' and uri (Biscay variation of Hiri), 'population'. The only town with the same name known today is called Bajauri (Basauri) in the County of Treviño.

Some place names (neighborhoods or places) of Basauri are:
Ariz, Arizgoiti, Arizgain and Arizbarren (Azbarren) Basozelai, Etxerre, Sarratu, Urbi, Bizkotxalde (Beaskoetxealde) Pozokoetxe, Pagobieta, Iruaretxeta, Artundoaga, Abaroa, Gaztañabaltza, Uriarte, Errekalde, Lapatza, Arteaga, Arteagagoitia, Uribarri, Kalero and Bidebieta (which appear as Dos Caminos (Two Paths) at the train station and made many think that it was the original name of the town.
The district now called Kalero, it is actually Calero and although some authors have seen in the name the Castilian translation of Kareaga, it simply refers to the fact that in this place it was located a holding of limestone for the manufacture of lime and those places in Spanish are called 'Calero'. There are two areas or neighborhoods called Kareaga: Kareaga Goikoa and Kareaga Behekoa and now called 'El Calero', since in both areas had lime plants. Moreover, there are Soloarte, Ugarte, Kantarazarra, Iturrigorri, Elexalde and others.

Festivities 

The festivities of San Fausto in October are the patron saint festivities of the municipality.

Virtually every major neighborhood forming Basauri, celebrates each year their festivities (The Kalero, San Miguel ...) but the most popular festivals in this town are those held in honor of San Fausto every (October 13), taking as an amulet the Escarabillera, and zurracapote as typical drink, which is prepared by the fifteen crews belonging to Herriko Taldeak, served in a jug to anyone coming to them. Zurracapote is a drink similar to sangria as it is made with red wine, lemon, cinnamon, some kind of liquor, sugar and, according to the legend, so shameful condiments that many would not want to know.

The Escarabillera is a character based on women and men in Basauri (as in many municipalities) would dress in times of greatest need at the beginning of century. Those clothes were worn to walk along tracks where steam trains as  they circulated (in their highway crossings) or heaps of smelters (Basconia) in search of coal that had set as a whole.  They used that coal for cooking in old metal kitchens. In the same way, coal was used asphalt many of the streets and lanes of this Basauri in early 20th century. For this reason it is very exciting to see the escarabillera walk from the start of the holidays until the end when it is released in the air seized by balloons with a message in several languages, hoping someone recover it. Although in many cases it does not get back, one year it went to Prague where one of the crews went to bring it back.

Economy
Until the industrial transformation of the late 19th century, Basauri was a purely agricultural area where corn is grown and pasture for cattle and sheep were harvested, and there were some flour mills. Subsequently, and before the massive deployment of industries and housing, sector has been gradually receding to near extinction.

So from the end of last century due to its location near Bilbao, and its industrial area, and the role of crossroads to the middle and upper valley of the Nervión and Ibaizábal, resulting in arrival of high-volume industries such immigrant population Basauri making a mainly industrial town.
Maintaining the condition of industrial population, the services sector has had in recent years an important development, being held today.
The active population is composed Basauri 20,265 people, of which 21.3% people are unemployed (2013).

Communications 
Basauri is 1,24 miles (2 km) from Bilbao. This proximity has given good communications system leading to the provincial capital by the A-8 and on the road Bilbao - Orduña by the south and the road Bilbao - Galdacao N-634 in the north. The railway lines of Renfe and Euskotren Trena cross the town and also make several stops in Basauri.

The underground also has two stops: one in the neighborhood of Ariz (inaugurated on February 28, 2011) and one in the neighborhood of Arizgoiti (November 11, 2011) called Basauri. Both stations are the last stations of the Line 2 of the underground.

It also has a free shuttle bus that connects the underground station Basauri with the neighborhood of San Miguel de Basauri.

It is being studied the modification of the San Miguel shuttle bus through urban neighborhoods to more significant services Basauri.

Culture 
Since 2005, the International Festival of Animated Film Basauri-Bizkaia (Animabasauri-Animasbasque) is held annually, Antzokia Social theatre is the venue of the principal project, together with other projection centers scattered around the region.
In 2008 the XXIII National Congress of Vexillology was held in Basauri, organized by the council and the Spanish Society of Vexillology.
In the series Qué vida más triste" (What a side life) from La Sexta, Basauri is the place where all the events happen.

 Elections, 2007 
After the 2007 elections, Loly de Juan (PSE-EE) became the mayor of Basauri, thanks to the favorable votes of the PP-PV.

There were 1,818 (8.37%) spoilt votes, while the blank ballots were 330 (1.66%). The abstention rate was 41.60% of the total inhabitants.

 Election of 2011 
In the 2011 elections the winner of the elections was Andoni Busquet.

{| Border = "1" cellpadding = "5" cellspacing = "0" align = "center"
|+City of Basauri
|Party ||Vote || 'Seats|-
|EAJ-PNV || 6904 || 8
|-
|PSE-EE || 6751 || 7
|-
|Bildu || 3280 || 3
|-
|PP in the Basque Country || 2615 || 3
|-
|EB-B || 912 || 0
|-
|Aralar' || 531 || 0
|-
|}

The abstention rate was 37.45%, the blank ballots and spoilt votes were 431 and 297 respectively.

 Famous citizens 

 Jon Arretxe (writer)
 Erlantz Gamboa (writer, LH Confidential winner) * https://es.wikipedia.org/wiki/Erlantz_Gamboa
 Javi Conde (athlete paralympic) medallist.
 Concha Espinosa (FETE sindicalist)
 Joxean Fernández Matxin (Saunier Duval cycling team director)
 Joseba Garmendia (footballer)
 Agustín Ibarrola (painter and sculptor)
 Naroa Intxausti Bolunburu (soprano)
 Rubén Ontiveros, Borja Pérez, Joseba Caballero (Qué vida más triste'' TV Show)
 Agustín 'Piru' Gaínza (footballer and trainer)
 Juan Solís Godoy (taekwondist medalist in Olympic Games)
 Óscar Vales Varela (footballer)
 Francisco Javier Yeste Navarro (footballer)
 Juanan Morales (basketball player)
 Jesús Lizaso (sculptor)
 Itziar Ituño (actor)
 Sergio Vez (curling player)

References

Notes

External links 

 Basauri in Google Maps
 City Council's Webpage (in Basque / Spanish)

Basauri in social networks: 
Facebook http://www.facebook.com/pages/Basauriko-Udala
Twitter https://twitter.com/BasaurikoUdala
YouTube https://www.youtube.com/user/UdalaBasauri

Municipalities in Biscay
Estuary of Bilbao